Leandro Vitiello (born 16 October 1985) is an Italian footballer. Vitiello was born in the Italian neighbourhood of Scafati and started his professional career with Melfi.

Club career
On 18 September 2020 he signed with Vibonese.

On 3 August 2021, he signed with Paganese. His contract with Paganese was terminated by mutual consent on 21 January 2022.

Club statistics

References

External links
 
 Leandro Vitiello at football.it  

1985 births
People from Scafati
Living people
Italian footballers
Association football midfielders
Italy youth international footballers
A.S. Melfi players
A.S. Ostia Mare Lido Calcio players
L.R. Vicenza players
U.S. Cremonese players
Ascoli Calcio 1898 F.C. players
A.S. Sambenedettese players
F.C. Grosseto S.S.D. players
AC Bellinzona players
U.S. Catanzaro 1929 players
Benevento Calcio players
U.S. Ancona 1905 players
U.S. Gavorrano players
U.S. Pistoiese 1921 players
U.S. Vibonese Calcio players
Paganese Calcio 1926 players
Serie B players
Serie C players
Serie D players
Footballers from Campania
Sportspeople from the Province of Salerno